Small nuclear ribonucleoprotein E is a protein that in humans is encoded by the SNRPE gene.

Interactions 

Small nuclear ribonucleoprotein polypeptide E has been shown to interact with DDX20 and Small nuclear ribonucleoprotein polypeptide F.

References

Further reading